Phalaenopsis ubonensis, is a species of orchid native to Thailand and Laos. The specific epithet ubonensis refers to the Thai province Ubon.

Description
This species of miniature, hot-growing, lithophytic orchid bears 6-12 leaves, which are 10-16 cm long, on 10-15 cm long stems. In summer and autumn, axillary, 50-150 cm long, erect, branched inflorescences produce fragrant, lavender, rose or lilac coloured flowers, which are larger than flowers of the allied species Phalaenopsis pulcherrima. The flowers are 5 cm wide.

Ecology
It is found in tropical lowland forests at elevations of 150-400 m above sea level.

Taxonomy
This species has an affinity to Phalaenopsis pulcherrima and Phalaenopsis buyssoniana.

References

ubonensis
Orchids of Thailand
Flora of Thailand
Orchids of Laos
Flora of Laos
Lithophytic orchids
Plants described in 2014